Jack Shea (7 August 1927 – 20 March 1983) was an  Australian rules footballer who played with Hawthorn in the Victorian Football League (VFL).

Notes

External links 

1927 births
1983 deaths
Australian rules footballers from Victoria (Australia)
Hawthorn Football Club players